Como is an unincorporated community in Henry County, Tennessee, United States. Its ZIP code (P.O. Box) is 38223.

Notes

Unincorporated communities in Henry County, Tennessee
Unincorporated communities in Tennessee